SS Hobart Baker was a Liberty ship built for the United States Maritime Commission during World War II. The ship was named in honor of Hobart Baker. Hobart "Hobey" Baker (1892–1918) was an American amateur athlete and is considered the first American star in ice hockey. He was also an American football player. The ship was assigned by the War Shipping Administration to General Steamship Company of San Francisco who operated it throughout World War II. Hobart Baker was laid down on 16 April 1943, launched on 12 May 1943 and completed on 24 May 1943, with the hull No. 1114 as part of the Emergency Shipbuilding Program, built is 38 days.

World war 2
SS Hobart Baker was loaded with supplies for the Pacific Ocean theater of World War II on 26 October 1944 by the 2486th Quartermaster Truck Company in San Francisco. Due to the need for supplies, she was loaded around the clock. Military vehicles were driven to the Hobart Baker from the 15th Aircraft Delivery Group (ADG) Motorpool. The vehicles were chained down in the cargo holds. Most of the vehicles were amphibious. She was also loaded with steel landing mats, called Marston Mat. Also, loaded was fuel and other needed supplies needed for an amphibious beach assault.

SS Hobart Baker joined one hundred ship convoy, TG 77.11, that was under the command of Captain J. B. McLean, The convoy was screened and protected by nine destroyers.  The convoy headed to Mindoro an island in Luzon of the Philippines to support the Battle of Mindoro. The convoy arrived in the Philippines on December 28. As soon as the convoy arrived it was under almost continuous attack. The PT tender USS Orestes was the first kamikaze hit. Liberty ship SS William Sharon was hit, she had a large fire on her superstructure, 11 crew killed, but stayed afloat and was repaired. LST-750 sank later in the day. On December 30 the convoy arrived Mangarin Bay in the morning. The goal was to unload and depart the same day. Unload was smooth till 3:40 pm, when five Imperial Japanese Navy (IJN) Aichi D3A started suicide attacks. The destroyers USS Gansevoort (DD-608) and USS Pringle (DD-477), and USS Porcupine were hit. The SS Francisco Morozan was damaged when a kamikaze plane exploded over the ship after it is shot down by US Navy plane. SS James H. Breasted sank with no lose of crew.

Hobart Baker was hit by two aerial bomb and sank. at 12°17'55"N, 121°04'47"E. Wounded were two of the 26-man US Navy Armed Guard. Of the 38 man merchant crew one was killed and one was wounded.

The Battle of Mindoro was the most costly for the US Merchant Marines. More Merchant Marines were killed in the Battle of Mindoro, than Army or Navy fighters.  Two Liberty ships, the SS John Burke and SS Lewis L. Dyche bombed with all crew members killed. SS John Burke 68 merchant seamen were killed and the on the Lewis L. Dyche 71 killed.  The Liberty ship SS Juan de Fuca was hit by Navy shells and hit by a kamikaze plane, strafed by Zeros, she was beached by her Captain to stop from sinking. She was repaired. The SS John M. Clayton was torpedo and hit by a bomb, she beached by her Captain to stop from sinking, as cargo was on fire and half her of the superstructure was gone.

See also
 Allied technological cooperation during World War II
 List of Liberty ships
 Type C1 ship
 Type C2 ship
 Victory ship
 U.S. Merchant Marine Academy

External links
U.S. Maritime Service Veterans

References

Maritime incidents in December 1944
Liberty ships
Ships built in Richmond, California
1943 ships